The Dannebroge was a Dano-Norwegian ship-of-the-line that exploded and sank on 4 October 1710, during the Great Northern War. Almost all of its crew of 600 were killed - one third of the victims were Norwegians. Admiral Iver Huitfeldt was among the casualties.

Construction
 
Dannebroge was built in 1692 and she was the largest ship-of-the-line in the Dano-Norwegian navy at that time with her 84 cannons placed on two decks and a crew of 600 men. She was also the first ship in Denmark that was built according to a plan drawing.

Career

The final battle
In 1710 Denmark–Norway was at war with Sweden. The Norwegian-born commander, Ivar Huitfeldt, was in charge of Dannebroge on October 4, 1710. Along with a Dano-Norwegian fleet of 44 other ships he had set sail for Liepāja (in modern Latvia). The mission was to escort 6,000 Russian troops to the Danish capital of Copenhagen, so they could support Denmark–Norway during the Great Northern War against the Swedes.

However, the fleet was intercepted by a Swedish fleet in the Battle of Køge Bay. According to the commander in chief of the Dano-Norwegian navy, Ulrik Christian Gyldenløve, the fire on Dannebroge was probably ignited by her own cannons. Gyldenløve mentions this in his letter to the king. Gyldenløve followed the battle from his ship Elephanten and wrote the letter at about 9 o'clock in the morning of October 5. It is unclear how many of the 600 men survived the explosion: some sources say three and others say nine.

wreck and commemoration

Today Dannebroge is the only wreck within Danish sea territory, where it is forbidden to dive. The official Danish institution of cultural heritage, Kulturarvsstyrelsen, considers it to be a cemetery.

Some cannon were salvaged in 1714; others were salvaged in 1875 by the company Svitzer, which also searched for other objects that could be sold at an auction. Some of the cannon were later used by Danish architect Vilhelm Dahlerup in his design of the Ivar Huitfeldt Monument at Langelinie in Copenhagen.

A 1:40 scale model of the ship was built by Orlogsmuseets Modelbyggerlaug ("The guild of model builders at the Naval Museum") in 2010. It was donated to the Royal Danish Navy in October 2010 as part of the celebrations of its 500 year Jubilee.

References

Citations
Royal Danish Naval Museum - Skibsregister - Record cards
Royal Danish Naval Museum - List of Ships

External links

  

1690s ships
Ships of the line of the Royal Dano-Norwegian Navy
Great Northern War
Shipwrecks of Denmark